St John Basil Wynne Willson (surname Wynne-Willson; 28 August 186815 October 1946) was an Anglican bishop in the first half of the 20th century. He was the Bishop of Bath and Wells from 1921 to 1937.

The maternal grandson of Michael Alexander, Bishop of Jerusalem, Willson was educated at Cheltenham and St John's College, Cambridge. He was an Assistant Master at The Leys School and Rugby before Headships at Haileybury College and Marlborough. Ordained in 1904, he was appointed Dean of Bristol in 1916, a post he held for five years. The Bishop of Bristol (George Nickson) and the Dean were strong supporters of Britain's involvement in the Great War and Willson, although 48, volunteered for the Army Chaplaincy. He was interviewed on 7 February 1917, and he asked to be posted to France or Salonika; but bouts of colon pain and shortsightedness meant that he had to serve in England. He left the army in 1918. He married Alice Lillian Wills in 1919, and died in 1946. He was consecrated a bishop on All Saints' Day 1921 (1 November) by Randall Davidson, Archbishop of Canterbury, at St Paul's Cathedral. He then served as Bishop of Bath and Wells until his retirement on 1 November 1937.

Publications

A classical scholar, Willson's translations included Aeschylus’ Prometheus Bound; Julius Caesar’s Gallic Wars, Books 4 and 5; Virgil's Aeneid, Books 5 and 6; and Lucian of Samosata's Wonderland (Vera Historia).

References

External links

People educated at Cheltenham College
Alumni of St John's College, Cambridge
Heads of schools in England
Deans of Bristol
20th-century Church of England bishops
Bishops of Bath and Wells
1868 births
1946 deaths